Mohamed Ofkir (born 4 August 1996) is a Norwegian football midfielder who plays for Vålerenga.

Professional career
He started his youth career in Rommen SK, before joining the junior ranks of Lillestrøm. He made his first-team debut in a friendly match in 2014, even scoring a goal. He made his Norwegian Premier League debut in April 2015 against Aalesund.

During winter transferwindow of 2017 his former coach at Lilleström SK, Runar Kristinsson signed him for Belgian side Sporting Lokeren, where he signed a contract for 2.5 years.

In January 2023, Ofkir signed for Vålerenga on a four-year contract, returning to the club he had spent time at as a youth.

Personal life
Ofkir is of Moroccan descent.

Career statistics

References

1996 births
Living people
Association football midfielders
Footballers from Oslo
Norwegian footballers
Norwegian people of Moroccan descent
Eliteserien players
Norwegian First Division players
Belgian Pro League players
Lillestrøm SK players
K.S.C. Lokeren Oost-Vlaanderen players
Sandefjord Fotball players
Sarpsborg 08 FF players
Vålerenga Fotball players
Norwegian expatriate footballers
Expatriate footballers in Belgium
Norwegian expatriate sportspeople in Belgium